Simon Fisher is a scientist.

Simon Fisher may also refer to:

Simon Fisher (priest), Anglican priest

See also
Simon Fisher Turner (born 1954), English musician
Simon Fisher-Becker (born 1961), English actor

Simon Fischer (disambiguation)